The Volunteer Reserves Service Medal (VRSM) is a medal which may be awarded to members of the Volunteer Reserves of all branches of the British Armed Forces - the Royal Naval Reserve, the Royal Marines Reserve, the Army Reserve and the Royal Auxiliary Air Force. It replaced the separate decorations and medals awarded respectively to officers and other ranks in each of the services - the Royal Navy's Reserve Decoration and Reserve Long Service and Good Conduct Medal, the British Army's Territorial Decoration and Efficiency Medal, and the Royal Air Force's  Air Efficiency Award - from 1 April 1999.

Description 
The medal is a silver oval, 38mm high and 32mm wide. The obverse depicts an image of the monarch. The reverse has the words, in five lines, FOR SERVICE IN THE VOLUNTEER RESERVES, above a sprig of oak leaves and acorns.  The medal is suspended from a ribbon that represents each of the services with narrow stripes of dark blue, scarlet and light blue in the centre (for the Navy, Army and Air Force, respectively) separated by a thin strip of yellow from dark green bands (representing the Reserves) at each edge.  Members of the Honourable Artillery Company receive the same medal but with their own ribbon.

Criteria 
The VRSM is awarded after 10 years' qualifying service in the Volunteer Reserves, although service in the Regular forces before joining the Reserves may count towards the qualifying period. However, a maximum of five years’ Regular service can be counted and this service is counted as half qualifying time. A clasp is awarded for each additional 5 years' service.

"VR" post-nominal letters
It was announced on 26 March 2015 by the Secretary of State for Defence, Michael Fallon, that Volunteer Reservists may use the post-nominal letters "VR" after 10 years' service, back-dated to 1999.  As the post-nominal recognition is available after a straight 10 years' service, reservists may find themselves entitled to use "VR" before the qualifying period and eligibility criteria for the VRSM have been achieved. The VRSM and the post-nominals VR are therefore not directly connected.

The postnominals "VR" should follow after the post-nominal letters denoting the grant of any state Honour or decoration, or educational or professional qualification.

See also
King's Volunteer Reserves Medal (KVRM)

References

External links

Military awards and decorations of the United Kingdom
Long and Meritorious Service Medals of Britain and the Commonwealth